Langdon is a masculine given name which may refer to:

 Langdon Cheves (1776–1857), American politician, lawyer and businessman
 Langdon Brown Gilkey (1919–2004), American theologian
 Langdon Lea (1874–1937), American college football Hall of Fame player and coach
 Langdon Elwyn Mitchell (1862–1935), American Broadway playwright
 Langdon Winner (born 1944), American academic and philosopher of technology

Masculine given names